Billy Dale Tidwell (April 8, 1932 – March 16, 2023) was an American university sports administrator and former college track and field and cross country coach. Tidwell served as Emporia State University's athletic director from 1971 to 1979, and coached track and field, as well as cross country from 1979 until 1984 after his retirement as athletics director.

Early years
Tidwell was born in Kiowa, Kansas and attended Kiowa High School. After high school, Tidwell attended the Kansas State Teachers College (KSTC) to compete in cross country and track & field. He was a four-time national NAIA champion. Tidwell graduated with a bachelor's of science education in health in 1957, followed by a master's degree in 1958. Tidwell received his doctorate from Columbia University.

Career
After graduating from KSTC in 1958, Tidwell became an assistant professor at Hunter College for one year before leaving for Oberlin College. While at Oberlin, Tidwell was the athletic director, cross country and track & field coach, and a professor in the health and education department. While at Oberlin, Tidwell became the first chairman of both the men's and women's sports. In 1971, Tidwell became the athletics director at his alma mater.

While at Emporia State from 1971 to 1979, Tidwell served as a professor, chair of the HPER department, and the athletics director. In 1979, Tidwell resigned as the athletics director, while continuing to teach and became the cross country and track & field coach for five years. Tidwell retired in 1994.

Awards and honors
In 1963, Tidwell became a member of the National Association of Intercollegiate Athletics Hall of Fame. In 1977, Tidwell entered the Drake Relays Hall of Fame. In 1982, Tidwell became a charter member at his alma mater's hall of fame and in 2014, was inducted into the Kansas Sports Hall of Fame. Oberlin College Athletics awards the "Billy Tidwell" to student athletes who show athleticism, professionalism, teaching, and community service.

References

1932 births
Emporia State University alumni
Emporia State Hornets athletic directors
Oberlin College faculty
People from Kiowa, Kansas
Sportspeople from Kansas